Ashley Steacy (born June 28, 1987) is a Canadian rugby union player. She won a gold medal at the 2015 Pan American Games as a member of the Canadian women's rugby sevens team.

In 2016, Steacy was named to Canada's first ever women's rugby sevens Olympic team which won Bronze at the Rio 2016 Olympics.

Awards and honors
Lethbridge Pronghorns 2010 Female Athlete of the Year 
U Sports National Women's Rugby Championships Most Valuable Player (2008)
U Sports Women's Rugby Rookie of the Year (2005)
U Sports Women's Rugby Athlete of the Year (2006, 2009)

References

External links
 
 
 
 

1987 births
Living people
Canadian female rugby union players
Canada women's international rugby union players
University of Lethbridge alumni
Sportspeople from Lethbridge
Rugby sevens players at the 2015 Pan American Games
Pan American Games gold medalists for Canada
Rugby sevens players at the 2016 Summer Olympics
Olympic rugby sevens players of Canada
Canada international rugby sevens players
Female rugby sevens players
Olympic bronze medalists for Canada
Olympic medalists in rugby sevens
Medalists at the 2016 Summer Olympics
Pan American Games medalists in rugby sevens
Medalists at the 2015 Pan American Games
Canada international women's rugby sevens players